Oakwood Cemetery Chapel may refer to:

Oakwood Cemetery Chapel (Allegan, Michigan), listed on the National Register of Historic Places in Allegan County, Michigan
Oakwood Cemetery Chapel (Cuyahoga Falls, Ohio), listed on the National Register of Historic Places in Summit County, Ohio

See also
Oakwood Cemetery (disambiguation)